The 2003 Australian Production Car Championship was a CAMS sanctioned Australian motor racing championship open to Group 3E Series Production Cars. The championship, which was organised by Procar Australia as part of the 2003 PROCAR Champ Series, was the 10th Australian Production Car Championship and the first to be contested since 1995. The Outright Drivers Championship was won by Scott Loadsman, driving a Holden VX Commodore SS.

Race Calendar
The 2003 Australian Production Car Championship was contested over a seven-round series.

Classes
Car competed in four classes, grouped by performance rather than by engine or vehicle type.

Points system
Outright Drivers Championship points were awarded in each race as shown on the following table.

In addition, three championship points were awarded to the driver who obtained pole position for Race 1 from the Qualifying session at each round.

Drivers Class Championship points were awarded on the same basis as Outright Drivers Championship points.

Manufacturers Trophy points were awarded on the same basis as Drivers Class Championship points.

Results

Outright Drivers Championship

Class Drivers Championships

Manufacturers Trophy

References

External links
 Image of Scott Loadsman (Holden Commodore VX) at Round 2 of the championship, procar.com.au via web.archive.org

Australian Production Car Championship
Production Car Championship